Il clan dei due Borsalini (Italian for "The clan of the two Borsalinos") is a 1971 comedy film directed by Giuseppe Orlandini and starring the comic duo Franco and Ciccio.

Plot

Cast 
 Franco Franchi as  Franco Franchetti, aka 'The Professor'
 Ciccio Ingrassia as Professor Francesco Ingrassini
 Isabella Biagini as The Ghost
 Lino Banfi as  Ferdi
 Gabriella Giorgelli as  Bruna la Svelta   
 Adriana Giuffrè as The Math Teacher	
 Evi Farinelli as Professor  Evi Rossi 
 Renato Malavasi as Don Ascanio 
 Franca Haas as The Servant
 Ignazio Leone	as Gino 	
 Flora Carosello as Franco's Wife
 Enzo Andronico as Member of the Gang
 Umberto D'Orsi	 as Inspector	 
 Luca Sportelli as  School Janitor
 Vincenzo Loglisi as Giulio

References

External links

1970s buddy comedy films
1970s crime comedy films
Films directed by Giuseppe Orlandini
Italian crime comedy films
Italian buddy comedy films
Films scored by Lallo Gori
1971 comedy films
1971 films
1970s Italian films